The House of Representatives of Jordan is the elected lower house of the Jordanian parliament which, along with the Senate, composes the legislature of Jordan.

The presiding officer is the speaker.

See also 
:Category:Members of the House of Representatives (Jordan)

References

Jordan
Politics of Jordan
Political organisations based in Jordan
 
1952 establishments in Jordan